Antecedent-contained deletion (ACD), also called antecedent-contained ellipsis, is a phenomenon whereby an elided verb phrase appears to be contained within its own antecedent. For instance, in the sentence "I read every book that you did", the verb phrase in the main clause appears to license ellipsis inside the relative clause which modifies its object. ACD is a classic puzzle for theories of the syntax-semantics interface, since it threatens to introduce an infinite regress. It is commonly taken as motivation for syntactic transformations such as quantifier raising, though some approaches explain it using semantic composition rules or by adoption more flexible notions of what it means to be a syntactic unit.

Movement-based analyses 
To understand the issue, it is necessary to understand how VP-ellipsis works. Consider the following examples, where the expected but elided VP is represented with a smaller font and subscripts and the antecedent to the ellipsis are in bold:

John washed the dishes, and Mary did wash the dishes, too.
John washed the dishes on Tuesday, and Mary did wash the dishes on Tuesday, too.

In each of these sentences, the VP has been elided in the second half, and the elided VP should be essentially identical to the antecedent in the first clause. That is, the missing VP in the first sentence can mean only wash the dishes, and in the second sentence, the missing VP can mean only wash the dishes on Tuesday. Assuming the missing VP must be essentially identical to an antecedent VP leads to a problem, first noticed by Bouton (1970):

John read every book that Mary did read every book that Mary did read every book that Mary did read every book etc..

Since the elided VP must be essentially identical to its antecedent, and assuming that the antecedent is a full VP, an infinite regress occurs (the subscripted text). That is, if we substitute in the antecedent VP into the position of the ellipsis, we must repeat the substitution process ad infinitum. The difficulty is further illustrated with the tree for the sentence:

The light grey font indicates the elided constituent, i.e. the ellipsis, and the underline marks the antecedent constituent to the ellipsis. Since the antecedent constituent contains the ellipsis itself, resolution of the ellipsis necessitates an infinite regress as the antecedent is substituted ad infinitum into the ellipsis cite. To avoid this problem, Sag (1976) proposed that the NP every book that Mary did undergoes quantifier raising (QR) to a position above the verb.

[every book that Mary did...]i John read ti.

Now the reference for the elided VP is simply the following:

read ti

The analysis can now assume that the elided VP in the example corresponds to just read, since after QR, the antecedent VP no longer contains the object raised NP:

[every book that Mary did read] John read.

The infinite regress is now avoided because after QR, the antecedent VP contains just the verb read.

Dependency analysis
An analysis of VP-ellipsis that takes the catena to be the fundamental unit of syntactic analysis (as opposed to the constituent) is not confronted with the antecedent containment problem. The ellipsis can correspond to a non-constituent catena, which means a movement analysis in terms of QR is not needed. The catena is a concrete unit of syntactic analysis associated with dependency grammar (DG); it is defined as any word or any word combination that is continuous with respect to dominance. The subscripted material in the examples above all qualify as catenae. The point is illustrated with the following further examples:

Both the elided material (in light grey) and the antecedent (in bold) to the elided material qualify as catenae. As catenae, both are concrete units of syntactic analysis. The need for a movement-type analysis (in terms of QR or otherwise) does not occur. One can note that the second of the two examples is an instance of pseudogapping, pseudogapping being a particular manifestation of VP-ellipsis.

See also

Verb phrase ellipsis
Ellipsis (linguistics)
Logical form (linguistics)
Constituent (linguistics)
Pseudogapping
Phrase structure grammar
Dependency grammar

Notes

References

Ágel, V., L. Eichinger, H.-W. Eroms, P. Hellwig, H. Heringer, and H. Lobin (eds.) 2003/6. Dependency and valency: An international handbook of contemporary research. Berlin: Walter de Gruyter.
Baltin, M. 1987. Do antecedent-contained deletions exist? Linguistic Inquiry 18, 4, 579-595.
Bouton, L. 1970. Antecedent-contained pro-forms. In Proceedings of Sixth Regional Meeting of the Chicago Linguistic Society, ed. M. Campbell Chicago, IL: University of Chicago.
Carnie, A. 20013. Syntax: A generative introduction. 3rd edition. Malden, MA: Wiley-Blackwell.
Culicover, P. 1997. Antecedent-contained deletion. Oxford, UK: Oxford University Press.
Hornstein, N. 1994. An argument for Minimalism: The case of antecedent-contained deletion. Linguistic Inquiry 25, 3, 455-480.
Kennedy, C.. 1997. Antecedent-Contained Deletion and the Syntax of Quantification. Linguistic Inquiry 28, 4, 662-688.
May, R. 1985. Logical Form: Its structure and derivation. Cambridge, MA: MIT Press.
Osborne, T. and T. Groß 2012. Antecedent containment: A dependency grammar solution in terms of catenae. Studia Linguistica 66, 2, 94-127.
Osborne, T., M. Putnam, and T. Groß 2012. Catenae: Introducing a novel unit of syntactic analysis. Syntax 15, 4, 354-396.
Sag, I. 1976. Deletion and Logical Form''. MIT dissertation.

Generative syntax
Semantics
Formal semantics (natural language)
Linguistics
Syntax–semantics interface